The Sumner Avenue station was a station on the demolished BMT Lexington Avenue Line in Brooklyn, New York City. It had 2 tracks and 2 side platforms. It was opened on May 13, 1885, and was located at the intersection of Lexington Avenue and Sumner Avenue. It also had connections to the Sumner Avenue Line streetcars. The station closed on October 13, 1950. The next southbound stop was Tompkins Avenue. The next northbound stop was Reid Avenue.

References

BMT Lexington Avenue Line stations
Railway stations in the United States opened in 1885
Railway stations closed in 1950
Former elevated and subway stations in Brooklyn
1885 establishments in New York (state)
1950 disestablishments in New York (state)